Old Stordal Church or the  is a former parish church of the Church of Norway in Fjord Municipality in Møre og Romsdal county, Norway. It is located in the village of Stordal. It is now a museum owned by the Society for the Preservation of Ancient Norwegian Monuments. It was once the church for the Stordal parish which is part of the Nordre Sunnmøre prosti (deanery) in the Diocese of Møre.

Design
The white, wooden church was built in an octagonal style in 1789 to replace an earlier stave church on the site.
 The building was designed by local priest Ebbe Carsten Tønder who died four years before construction was completed, so it must have been planned at the time of Norddal Church (completed 1782). Tønder came from Trondheim and may have been inspired by the two older octagonal churches there. The church seats about 170 people. It is one of the most decorated churches in Norway. Wood materials from the stave church was probably reused, such as in the roof of the vestibule and the four large columns. There is a crucifix (13th century) and a baptismal font from the older church. The stave church was likely rose painted inside too.

Interior
While the exterior is plain white, the interior (walls, columns, ceiling) is richly decorated. The style is 18th century renaissance. Along walls there are images of Biblical characters and events. The five "bad maidens" and five "god maidens" are depicted on the north wall, or the left hand side that was traditionally women's side. The message reads: "Do not be reckless like the bad maidens that lost their bridegroom and forgot their beatitude." David and Goliath and Samson and the lion are also on the north wall. The apostles are portrayed on the south wall, while the evangelists can be seen above the entrance to the choir.

History
The earliest existing historical records of the church date back to 1432, but it wasn't new at that time. The first church in Stordal was a wooden stave church that may have been built in the 14th century. The church is listed in Aslak Bolt's cadastre and later records. Hans Strøm in 1766 described the old stave church: "It is a small and modest stave church, that is not particular in any way. The building is maintained by the congregation that also owns it." In 1788, the old stave church was torn down and replaced by a brand new church on the same site the following year. The church from 1789 is still standing, but it was taken out of use in 1907 when the new Stordal Church was built. In 1908, the old church was purchased by the Society for the Preservation of Ancient Norwegian Monuments which has preserved it as a museum since that time.

Gallery

See also
List of churches in Møre

References

Fjord (municipality)
Churches in Møre og Romsdal
Wooden churches in Norway
Octagonal churches in Norway
18th-century Church of Norway church buildings
Churches completed in 1789
14th-century establishments in Norway
Stordal Church